KCKC (102.1 FM) is an adult contemporary radio station based in Kansas City, Missouri that operates with an ERP of 100 kW. The station is licensed to and operated by Steel City Media. The station's studios are located at Westport Center in Midtown Kansas City, and its transmitter is located in Independence, Missouri.

History

Early years
The station first signed on in 1948 as a simulcast for WHB. Cook Paint and Varnish Company owned the station. This would only last for about two years, as FM radio was still in its infancy. The company turned in the license in 1950.

Transcontinent TV signed on WDAF-FM on March 5, 1961, as a simulcast partner to the AM station (now KCSP and owned by Entercom). WDAF-FM was an NBC affiliate, with 36,000 watts of power. Taft Broadcasting took over in 1964.

In 1967, WDAF-FM flipped to Top 40. The new format aired in afternoons and nights, while maintaining a simulcast with the AM station in the morning and midday. The FM started a middle of the road format on January 15, 1968, referring to themselves as "Popular 102". The station upgraded to 100,000 watts on New Year's Day, 1971. Also that year, WDAF-FM flipped to oldies, the first time an FM station in Kansas City has attempted at the format. It began with Drake-Chenault's syndicated "History of Rock and Roll". Drake didn't actually call it oldies; they referred to the automated programming as "Vintage Top 40". WDAF-FM returned to Top 40 just 4 months later in May 1971. By 1974, WDAF-FM was leaning middle of the road again, and completely automated.

KY 102
On July 1, 1974, one of Kansas City's legendary radio stations signed on, when WDAF-FM flipped to album oriented rock (AOR), branded as "KY 102", and changed call letters to KYYS (the "KY" in the slogan refers to the first and last letters in "Kansas City"). The first (and ultimately, last) song on "KY 102" was "Too Many People" by Paul McCartney. KYYS became the most successful AOR station in Kansas City, hitting #1 in the ratings in 1979 when acts like Bad Company, Styx, REO Speedwagon, Bob Seger, KISS and Journey were popular, along with legendary personality Max Floyd's anti-disco speeches under the name "The Rock and Roll Army." KYYS expanded and contracted the playlist over the years as the music dictated, sometimes leaning heavily on gold material, and sometimes being more adventurous with new music. For many years, the station went without meaningful competition. Many of the personalities spent a long time at the station, including a couple who were on the air the day the format started in 1974, and the day it ended in 1997. Great American Broadcasting (later Citicasters) bought the station in 1987.

KYYS, for a time, competed with KSAS, KKCI or KXXR (all located at 106.5 FM, now the current incarnation of WDAF-FM). However, in April 1992, KRVK flipped from adult contemporary to active rock as KQRC. This began the end of KY's long dominance in the ratings, as KQRC took away many listeners with new hard and modern rock that KYYS generally ignored. When KY finally started playing acts such as Pearl Jam and Red Hot Chili Peppers, it was too late, and their ratings never recovered. The station also tended to avoid playing Metallica and similar heavy metal bands. By 1997, KYYS leaned very heavily on new music, playing as much of it as they could from artists like Dave Matthews Band, The Wallflowers, Sheryl Crow, and Collective Soul. However, this could not prevent the inevitable from happening.

The Zone
In September 1996, after the passage of the sweeping Telecommunications Act of 1996, Citicasters merged with Jacor Communications. In June 1997, KYYS was sold off to American Radio Systems, and then to Westinghouse/CBS in September (their AM sister station, WDAF, would be sold to Entercom in October). On September 19, 1997, at 12:01 a.m., KYYS flipped to modern adult contemporary, branded as "102.1 The Zone". The first song on "The Zone" was "A Change Would Do You Good" by Sheryl Crow. KYYS' staff barely had a chance to set up the final hour of music and to say goodbye to listeners; in addition, the airstaff was let go barely an hour before the change. (In fact, the official goodbye came a week after the format change, when KYYS staff members held a midday interview simulcast on KQRC and KCFX, which were then owned by the same company.) On January 16, 1998, the station's call letters changed to KOZN. The station's ratings plummeted even further, as the station's playlist sounded quite similar to sister station KMXV, which airs a Top 40/CHR format that, at the time, leaned heavily on alternative rock. In addition, KYYS was revived on former adult contemporary station KLTH about a month after 102.1's flip, this time as a classic rock station featuring many of KY's earlier personalities. (Since June 2020, KYSJ in St. Joseph has broadcast a classic rock format using the "KY 102" branding.)

In June 1998, CBS split off the radio division under the revived Infinity Broadcasting name, which would be renamed CBS Radio in December 2005.

Star 102
On January 4, 1999, at 5 p.m., after playing "Ants Marching" by Dave Matthews Band, KOZN began stunting with ocean sounds, as well as liners redirecting listeners to KMXV, and to listen at 9 a.m. the following day for something new on 102.1. At the promised time, KOZN flipped to adult contemporary, branded as "Star 102”, under new Program Director Jon Zellner (who continued to program KMXV). The first song on "Star" was "Nothing's Gonna Stop Us Now" by Starship. On February 1, KOZN changed their call letters to KSRC. "Star" primarily competed with Entercom's KUDL and KCIY. The station also aired Christmas music during the holiday season to compete with KUDL, a tradition that began in November 1999. (A few times, the two stations would flip to Christmas music within hours of each other, and on occasion, KSRC/KCKC would be the first station to go all-Christmas in the United States.) It would only take a year for KSRC to beat KUDL in the ratings. Zellner left the station in 2004. In 2005, KSRC changed to a more upbeat image, dropping most soft-sounding music. Despite the new upbeat image, KSRC added John Tesh's syndicated "Intelligence For Your Life" for nights in September 2005; it lasted a few months. On January 24, 2006, the station changed call letters to KCKC, in what was reportedly a near format flip to CBS Radio's FM Talk format as "Free FM". CBS canceled the format flip after the ratings of other Free FM stations across the country tanked. In November 2006, Wilks Broadcasting bought the station due to CBS wanting to concentrate on larger media markets. John Tesh's show soon returned to nights, and eventually, replays from the previous night aired in the afternoons.

While popular for many years, both KUDL and KCKC began to decline in the Arbitron ratings after the introduction of the Portable People Meter in early 2009. KUDL, though, usually had the upper hand compared to KCKC, most likely due to that station's heritage in the market, as they had been in the format since 1977. In addition, most AC stations across the country were declining in ratings during this time period, due to challenges while attempting to attract a younger audience.

Alice 102
During the station's annual Christmas music run on December 22, 2010, KCKC began promoting "a new sound coming" on January 3, 2011. In addition, the station's website displayed a countdown clock to the announcement, which would take place that day at Noon. At that time, after playing "Same Old Lang Syne" by Dan Fogelberg, KCKC flipped to AAA, branded as "Alice 102". The first song on "Alice" was "The One I Love" by R.E.M. Initially, the format had a precise gold lean to it, mostly concentrating on rock music from the 1980s, and a wide library, with less of a focus on personalities. As the year progressed, with several music festivals hosted in the city throughout the year (especially the popular "Kanrocksas" festival at Kansas Speedway), the station added more current music. "Alice" competed with Entercom's modern rock KRBZ, Cumulus Media's classic rocker KCFX, and non-commercial AAA-formatted KTBG. During the station’s tenure as “Alice", KCKC's ratings would hang around the 2.5 share range (#15-16) of the market.

KC 102.1
On January 27, 2014, Wilks registered the domain "KC1021.com", possibly signaling another format change or altering for the second time in three years. Three days later, Wilks registered "Alt102.com." On February 4, at 6:00 p.m., after playing Semisonic's "Closing Time", KCKC began stunting with a countdown to 3:00 p.m. the following afternoon, when the station flipped back to adult contemporary, branded as "KC 102.1". The first song on "KC" was "Get The Party Started" by P!nk. When the station relaunched its AC format, it featured the "More Music, More Variety, More Fun" slogan, as well as an emphasis on songs from the 1980s, including "Totally ‘80s Weekends" airing every weekend. The station also began to air all-Christmas music again, replacing sister station KFKF, who continued the tradition after the demise of "Star 102" three years prior.

On June 12, 2014, Wilks announced that it would sell its Kansas City cluster (including KCKC) to Pittsburgh-based Steel City Media. The sale was approved on September 26, 2014, and was consummated on September 30. Shortly after the sale was approved, KCKC dropped the all-80s weekends, reduced its focus on 80s music and included more currents/recurrents in their playlist. In addition, KCKC changed their slogan to "Today's Best Variety." Since then, KCKC has broadened their library to include hits from the 1970s to the present day.

References

External links

CKC
Independence, Missouri
Mainstream adult contemporary radio stations in the United States
Taft Broadcasting
1961 establishments in Missouri